Teletón is a charity event held in Chile on a yearly basis since 1978. It is usually held during the first week of December, unless a political election occurs at the same time. The major Chilean television networks hold a 27-hour transmission, to raise funds to help children with developmental disabilities (most commonly cerebral palsy) treated at Instituto de Rehabilitación Infantil ("Infant Rehabilitation Institute") centers of the Fundación Teletón.
In Chile, the transmission of Teletón is an event of national unity  and, proportionately, the most widely watched telethon in the world.

Since the first telethon, over US$286 million has been raised, and 14 rehabilitation centers have been built in the cities of Arica, Iquique, Antofagasta, Calama, Copiapó, Coquimbo, Valparaíso, Santiago, Talca, Concepción, Temuco, Valdivia, Puerto Montt and Coyhaique.

During the annual event, local and worldwide stars participate in live events across the country. Teletón has been hosted by television personality Mario Kreutzberger, best known by his stage name Don Francisco, since the first event, aired in 1978. Each year, a poster child is elected to become the face of the charity.

With the exception of the initial Teletón in 1978, each year's goal is set to be exactly the total amount raised in the previous event, in the spirit of increasing the funds available to the Foundation to account for increased inflation and overall maintenance costs.
Up until now, the goal has been reached and surpassed on all Teletón versions with the exception of 1995's, were the final account was roughly 12% short of that year's goal.

Telethons

See also
 Chile helps Chile—2010 telethon in response to the 2010 Chile earthquake

References

Notes

External links

 Fundación Teletón
 Asociación Nacional de Televisión de Chile
 Oritel

Telethons
Recurring events established in 1978
1978 Chilean television series debuts
Non-profit organisations based in Chile
1978 establishments in Chile
 
Disability in Chile